Paul Viardot (20 July 1857 – 1 December 1941) was a French violinist and composer who appeared with great success in Paris and London.

Life
Viardot was born in Courtavenel, son of the distinguished singer and composer Pauline Viardot. The Belgian violinist Charles de Bériot, second husband of Paul's aunt, Maria Malibran, remained close to the Viardots and took an interest in the boy, though Paul actually studied with Bériot's successor at the Brussels Conservatoire, Hubert Léonard (also related by marriage to the Garcia clan). Though Carl Flesch dismissed Paul Viardot as a salon player, he was clearly more than that, as he toured widely. He was a close friend to Gabriel Fauré, who was briefly engaged to his sister Marianne, and dedicated his first violin sonata to him.

Viardot's recordings are rare, and some were poorly engineered. But they are examples of the Franco-Belgian school of violin playing in its rather tight phase, before the loosening and relaxing influence of Eugène Ysaÿe.

Viardot's compositions include two sonatas, several concert solos and smaller violin works as well as important contributions to the literature of music.

Genealogy

External links

References

1857 births
1941 deaths
19th-century French composers
19th-century French male classical violinists
20th-century French composers
20th-century French male classical violinists
French male classical composers
People from Seine-et-Marne